The scrapermouth mbuna (Labeotropheus trewavasae) is a species of cichlid endemic to Lake Malawi where it prefers areas with rocky substrates.  This species can reach a length of  TL.  This species can also be found in the aquarium trade. Its specific name honours the British ichthyologist Ethelwynn Trewavas (1900-1993) of the British Museum (Natural History).

References

scrapermouth mbuna
scrapermouth mbuna
Taxa named by Geoffrey Fryer
Taxonomy articles created by Polbot